Following are the programs on the 1951–1952 United States network television weekday schedule, listing daytime Monday–Friday schedules on four networks for each calendar season from September 1951 to August 1952. All times are Eastern and Pacific.  This page is missing info on the DuMont Television Network, which started daytime transmission before any other United States television network.

Talk shows are highlighted in  yellow, local programming is white, reruns of prime-time programming are orange, game shows are pink, soap operas are chartreuse, news programs are gold and all others are light blue. New series are highlighted in bold.

Fall 1951

Winter 1951/1952
{| border="1" cellpadding="2" style="font-size:80%"
!bgcolor="#C0C0C0"| 
!width="13%" bgcolor="#C0C0C0"|7:00 am
!width="14%" bgcolor="#C0C0C0"|7:30 am
!width="13%" bgcolor="#C0C0C0"|8:00 am
!width="14%" bgcolor="#C0C0C0"|8:30 am
!width="13%" bgcolor="#C0C0C0"|9:00 am
!width="14%" bgcolor="#C0C0C0"|9:30 am
!width="13%" bgcolor="#C0C0C0"|10:00 am
!width="14%" bgcolor="#C0C0C0"|10:30 am
!width="13%" bgcolor="#C0C0C0"|11:00 am
!width="14%" bgcolor="#C0C0C0"|11:30 am
!width="13%" bgcolor="#C0C0C0"|noon
!width="14%" bgcolor="#C0C0C0"|12:30 pm
!width="13%" bgcolor="#C0C0C0"|1:00 pm
!width="14%" bgcolor="#C0C0C0"|1:30 pm
!width="13%" bgcolor="#C0C0C0"|2:00 pm
!width="14%" bgcolor="#C0C0C0"|2:30 pm
!width="13%" bgcolor="#C0C0C0"|3:00 pm
!width="14%" bgcolor="#C0C0C0"|3:30 pm
!width="13%" bgcolor="#C0C0C0"|4:00 pm
!width="14%" bgcolor="#C0C0C0"|4:30 pm
!width="13%" bgcolor="#C0C0C0"|5:00 pm
!width="14%" bgcolor="#C0C0C0"|5:30 pm
|-
!bgcolor="#C0C0C0"|ABC
|bgcolor="white" colspan="9"|local programming
|bgcolor="yellow"|The Dennis James Show / The Paul Dixon Show (MWF, from 2/23)
|bgcolor="yellow" colspan="2"| The Frances Langford-Don Ameche Show
|bgcolor="yellow"|1:00 pm: Gayelord Hauser Show (W F)
1:15 pm: local programming
|bgcolor="white" colspan="9"|local programming
|-
!bgcolor="#C0C0C0"|CBS
|bgcolor="white" colspan="5"|local programming
|bgcolor="gold"|9:30 am: local programming
9:45 am: Morning News (to 10:30 am F)
|bgcolor="yellow" colspan="3"|10:00 am Arthur Godfrey Time
10:45 am: The Al Pearce Show
|bgcolor="pink"|Strike It Rich
|bgcolor="chartreuse"|12:00 Noon: The Egg and I
12:15 pm: Love of Life
|bgcolor="chartreuse" colspan="2"|12:30 pm: Search for Tomorrow
12:45 pm: The Steve Allen Show (talk show -to 2/22)
|bgcolor="yellow" colspan="2"|The Garry Moore Show
|bgcolor="chartreuse" colspan="2"|2:30 pm: The First Hundred Years
2:45 pm: Bride and Groom (until 2/1)
3:00 pm: Mike and Buff (variety, from 2/4 from 2:45 pm)
|bgcolor="yellow"|Bert Parks Show / The Mel Torme Show (Tu Th)
|bgcolor="yellow"|Homemaker's Exchange (to 1/25)
|bgcolor="white" colspan="3"|local programming
|-
!bgcolor="#C0C0C0"|NBC
|bgcolor="gold" colspan="4"|The Today Show
|bgcolor="white" colspan="2"|local programming
|bgcolor="yellow"|Breakfast Party
|bgcolor="pink"|It's in the Bag (to 2/15) / Winner Take All (from 2/27)
|bgcolor="yellow"|Kovacs on the Corner
|bgcolor="yellow"|11:30 am: Dave & Charlie
11:45 am: Richard Harkness News Review|bgcolor="yellow"|Ruth Lyons 50 Club
|bgcolor="yellow"|The Bunch / It's a Problem (from 2/25)
|bgcolor="white" colspan="4"|local programming
|bgcolor="pink"|The Big Payoff|bgcolor="pink"|The Ralph Edwards Show (MWF) / The Bill Goodwin Show (Tu Th)
|bgcolor="yellow" colspan="2"|The Kate Smith Hour
|bgcolor="chartreuse"|5:00 pm: Hawkins Falls 
5:15 pm: The Gabby Hayes Show
|bgcolor="lightblue"|Howdy Doody
|-
!bgcolor="#C0C0C0"|DMN
|bgcolor="white" colspan="22"|?
|}

Spring 1952

Summer 1952

By network
ABCReturning SeriesNew SeriesThe Dennis James ShowThe Frances Langford-Don Ameche ShowThe Gayelord Hauser ShowThe Paul Dixon ShowNot Returning From 1950-51The Half-Pint Party
Hold'er Newt
Lois and Looie
The Mary Hartline Show
Mr. Magic and J.J.
Ozmoe
Paddy the Pelican
Space Patrol
TV Tots Time

CBSReturning SeriesAction in the Afternoon
As the World Turns
The Big Payoff
The Bill Cullen Show
The Bob Crosby Show
Break the Bank
Bride and Groom
CBS News
CBS Evening News
The Edge of Night
The Egg and I
Face the Nation
The First Hundred Years
Freedom Rings
The Garry Moore Show
The Guiding Light
Homemaker's Exchange
Love of Life
Meet Your Cover Girl
The Mel Torme Show
Morning News
Search for Tomorrow
The Steve Allen Show
Strike It Rich
The U.N. in ActionNew SeriesThe Al Pearce ShowArthur Godfrey TimeBert Parks ShowThe Eddy Arnold Show *Mike and BuffSummer SchoolWhistling WizardYour Surprise StoreNot Returning From 1950-51All Around the Town
The Betty Crocker Show
The Chuck Wagon
Fashion Magic
It's Fun to Know
The Johnny Johnston Show
The Life with Snarky Parker
Look Your Best
Lucky Pup
Robert Q's Matinee
Two Sleepy People
Vanity Fair
The World Is Yours

NBCReturning SeriesThe Bill Cullen Show
Breakfast Party
Howdy Doody
The Kate Smith Hour
Meet the Press
NBC News Update
NBC Saturday Night News
NBC Sunday Night News
Strike It Rich
The Today Show
Vacation WonderlandNew SeriesThe Big PayoffThe Bill Goodwin ShowThe BunchDave & CharlieThe Gabby Hayes ShowHere's Looking at YouIt's a ProblemIt's in the BagThe Johnny Dugan ShowKovacs on the CornerMatinee in New YorkThe Ralph Edwards ShowRichard Harkness News ReviewRuth Lyons 50 ClubWinner Take AllNot Returning From 1950-51America Speaks
Cowboy Playhouse
Miss Susan
The NBC Comics
Panhandle Pete and Jennifer
The Ransom Sherman Show
Remember this Date
The Straw Hat Matinee

DumontNot Returning From 1950-51'Okay, MotherTV Shopper''

See also
1951-52 United States network television schedule (prime-time)

Sources
https://web.archive.org/web/20071015122215/http://curtalliaume.com/abc_day.html
https://web.archive.org/web/20071015122235/http://curtalliaume.com/cbs_day.html
https://web.archive.org/web/20071012211242/http://curtalliaume.com/nbc_day.html

United States weekday network television schedules
1951 in American television
1952 in American television